Abdul Kader Keïta (born 6 August 1981) is an Ivorian former professional footballer who played as a winger. He represented the Ivory Coast national football team from 2000 to 2012.

Club career
Keïta, also known as 'Popito', began his career at homeland club Africa Sports, before moving on to Tunisian Club Etoile du Sahel. Following spells in United Arab Emirates with Al Ain and Qatar with Al Sadd, he moved to France with Ligue 1 club OSC Lille in 2005.

Lyon
On 31 May 2007, Olympique Lyonnais chairman Jean-Michel Aulas revealed that the club had made bids for both Keïta and his fellow teammate Mathieu Bodmer.

On 16 June 2007, Lyon confirmed the signing of Keïta from Lille for €18 million, with Bodmer also moving to Lyon. During his two seasons at the club, he made 52 appearances in all competitions, scoring 5 goals.

Galatasaray
On 2 July 2009, Galatasaray officially announced that Keïta joined the Turkish club and signed a three-year contract, for €8.5 million transfer fee plus €500,000 variable. He scored his first goal for Galatasaray in a Europa League qualification match against Maccabi Netanya in the 5th minute. On 12 December, Keïta scored for Galatasaray in a 3–2 victory over Antalyaspor.

On 18 February 2010, Keïta scored a late equalizer to secure a 1–1 away draw for Galatasaray against Atlético Madrid in the Europa League. Later, in the second leg he equalized again to make it 1–1, but Galatasaray failed to qualify. On 28 February, he scored the second and fourth goals in a 4–1 victory over Kasımpaşa. His first goal was a volley from just inside the penalty area. In Galatasaray's 3–0 victory over MKE Ankaragücü in March, Keïta scored the second goal as well as assisting the final goal. On 11 April 2010, he assisted two of Milan Baroš' goals in a 4–1 victory over Diyarbakırspor. A week later, he scored the first goal in a 1–2 victory over Manisaspor.

Al Sadd
Keïta rejoined his previous club Al Sadd SC in July 2010, for €8.15 million.

Keïta was involved in a melee which ensued on 19 October in the 2011 AFC Champions League semi final first-leg between Suwon Samsung Bluewings and Al Sadd. Suwon player Choi Sung-Hwan was inadvertently kicked in the head by an Al Sadd defender, and Suwon's Yeom Ki-hoon let the ball out after Choi Sung-hwan went down with a head injury inside Al Sadd's box. While Choi was being tended to by medics, Keïta took the free kick quickly, and passed it to teammate Mamadou Niang unknowingly to the Suwon defense who thought possession would be returned to them according to FIFA fair play rules. Niang sprinted down the center half past the goalkeeper to score a second goal for Al Sadd. The chaos was further elevated when a Suwon fan ran onto the pitch, causing a brawl to erupt between the two teams. Afterwards, Keïta received a red card, allegedly for running towards the fan, slapping him in the back of the head and grabbing him by his throat. His teammate Lee Jung-Soo had told the press that Keïta had apologized for assisting Niang in scoring the goal, and admitted it was wrong. Al Sadd's coach, Jorge Fossati, suggested that Al Sadd was annoyed that Suwon had not immediately put the ball out of play, and decided to take actions into their own hands. Keïta was later suspended by AFC for the return leg.

Keïta scored a goal in the AFC Champions League Final on 5 November, as his side defeated Jeonbuk Motors on penalties after the match ended 2–2 and was named as Man of the Match. He left the team at the end of the 2011–12 season, and was linked with several teams in England and stated his interest of playing in the Premier League.

International career
Keïta had a distinguished international career with 72 caps for the Ivory Coast, representing the team at the 2006 FIFA World Cup, 2010 FIFA World Cup and at four Africa Cup of Nations in 2002, 2008, 2010, and 2012, helping them finish runner-up in  2012.

Keïta was selected for 2010 African Nations Cup and played three matches, scoring once against Algeria during the quarter-final match.

2010 World Cup incident
During the 2010 FIFA World Cup in South Africa, Keïta was involved in an off-the-ball incident with Kaká during a group game against Brazil. Keïta ran into Kaká and fell onto the floor, clutching his face, as if in great pain. Kaká was shown a yellow card, his second of the match, and sent off. ABC wrote "Abdul Kader Keïta's embarrassing reaction to a love-tap in the midriff from the Brazilian playmaker was both laughable and disgraceful. Obviously hoping to get Kaka in further hot water after he had only just earlier been shown his first yellow card, Keïta fell to the ground and clutched his face as if he'd been shot from close range. He blatantly cheated to ensure the Brazilian was given his marching orders."

The incident has been named by numerous journalists as among the most shameful in the World Cup and was called "disgraceful" by the sports announcer, and Keïta's actions named in the ten worst moments of the World Cup. Keïta was named to the 2010 World Cup "Infamous 11" as one of the all-around worst sportsmen in the tournament.

Personal life
Keïta's older brother, Fadel, is also a former professional footballer and Ivorian international.

Honours
Africa Sports
African Cup Winners' Cup: 1999

Al-Ain
UAE Pro League: 2001–02
GCC Champions League: 2001

Al-Sadd
Qatar Stars League: 2003–04
Emir of Qatar Cup: 2002–03, 2004–05
Qatar Crown Prince Cup: 2003
AFC Champions League: 2011

Lyon
Ligue 1: 2007–08
Coupe de France: 2007–08
Trophée des Champions: 2007

References

External links
 
 
 
 
 
 Keïta is runner up for Ivorian Player of the Year award, BBC Sport, 6 January 2007

1981 births
Living people
Footballers from Abidjan
Ivorian footballers
Association football midfielders
Ivory Coast international footballers
2002 African Cup of Nations players
2006 FIFA World Cup players
2008 Africa Cup of Nations players
2010 Africa Cup of Nations players
2010 FIFA World Cup players
2012 Africa Cup of Nations players
Africa Sports d'Abidjan players
Étoile Sportive du Sahel players
Al Ain FC players
Al Sadd SC players
Lille OSC players
Olympique Lyonnais players
Galatasaray S.K. footballers
Budapest Honvéd FC players
Persib Bandung players
Qatar Stars League players
Ligue 1 players
Süper Lig players
Nemzeti Bajnokság I players
UAE Pro League players
Ivorian expatriate footballers
Expatriate footballers in Tunisia
Expatriate footballers in the United Arab Emirates
Expatriate footballers in Qatar
Expatriate footballers in France
Expatriate footballers in Turkey
Expatriate footballers in Hungary
Ivorian expatriate sportspeople in Tunisia
Ivorian expatriate sportspeople in the United Arab Emirates
Ivorian expatriate sportspeople in Qatar
Ivorian expatriate sportspeople in France
Ivorian expatriate sportspeople in Turkey
Ivorian expatriate sportspeople in Hungary